Nicola Miles-Wildin (born 1978 in Gloucester) is a British disabled theatre and radio director. She has worked as an actor. Nicola has juvenile chronic arthritis and uses a wheelchair. She portrayed Alice in Richard Cameron's play Flower Girls, a play about disabled women. In the 2012 Summer Paralympics opening ceremony she portrayed the part of Miranda from Shakespeare's The Tempest.

References

English radio actresses
English stage actresses
1978 births
Living people
People from Gloucester
Alumni of the University of Glamorgan